Claudio Rivadero (born February 24, 1970 in Bell Ville, Argentina) is a former Argentine footballer who played for clubs of Argentina, Chile, Bolivia and Venezuela.

Teams
  Talleres de Córdoba 1991–1993
  Belgrano de Córdoba 1993–1994
  San Lorenzo 1994–1999
  Gimnasia y Esgrima de Jujuy 2000
  Rangers 2000
  Deportivo Italchacao 2001
  Deportivo Táchira 2001–2002
  San José 2003
  La Paz FC 2004–2005

References
 Profile at BDFA 

1970 births
Living people
Argentine footballers
Argentine expatriate footballers
Gimnasia y Esgrima de Jujuy footballers
Club Atlético Belgrano footballers
Talleres de Córdoba footballers
San Lorenzo de Almagro footballers
Club San José players
La Paz F.C. players
Deportivo Táchira F.C. players
Rangers de Talca footballers
Expatriate footballers in Chile
Expatriate footballers in Bolivia
Expatriate footballers in Venezuela
Association football midfielders
Sportspeople from Córdoba Province, Argentina